Ikhlas Khouli was a 35-year-old resident of Tulkarm, West Bank, and mother of seven who was executed in 2002, without trial, by Fatah's Al-Aqsa Martyrs Brigade for allegedly collaborating with Israel. She was the first Palestinian woman to be executed for such a crime.

References

External links
Palestinian Group Affiliated With Fatah Leadership Kill First Woman Informer
NPR Profile: Killing of Palestinians Who Have Been Branded as Collaborators

2002 deaths
People from Tulkarm
Year of birth missing